The Black Swan is the third studio album by American rock band Story of the Year.

Background and recording
Story of the Year's second album In the Wake of Determination was released in October 2005 through major label Maverick Records. By July 2006, the band had accumulated nine-and-a-half new tracks for their next album. They spent the following five months working on a live DVD until February 2007, when work began on a new album in earnest. During this time, Maverick Records folded and was incorporated into another major label, who opted to drop the band from their contract.

On October 29, 2007, it was announced that the band had signed to independent label Epitaph Records. In addition, it was mentioned that the band were in the studio with producer John Feldmann, aiming to release their next album in spring 2008. The band explained the switch to an independent: "If a band doesn't have a mega bubble–gum shiny pop hit, chances are the label will not even put the record out, much less push it. To [us], it just doesn't seem like a very cool environment to be in". The sessions with Feldmann at Foxy Studios resulted in "Wake Up", "Tell Me (P.A.C.)", "Message to the World", and "Terrified"; Matt Appleton and Kyle Moorman served as engineers. Michael Baskette, who produced the remaining songs, aided with the group's drum sound, knowing when to make a certain hit sound harder. Sessions with Baskette occurred at Studio Barbarosa in Bavon, Virginia. Dave Holdredge acted as his engineer, while Jeff Moll did digital editing. Recording was reportedly finished by the end of December. Chris Lord-Alge mixed "Wake up", while the remaining songs were mixed by Baskette and Holdredge at Barbarosa; Ted Jensen mastered the album at Sterling Sound.

Composition
Marsala said it had the heavy tone of Determination and the melodic/poppy nature of Page Avenue, drawing comparisons to Underoath, Alexisonfire and BoySetsFire. The album was named after Nassim Nicholas Taleb's book, The Black Swan: The Impact of the Highly Improbable, on unpredictable events and randomness. One theme found in a few of the songs ("Wake Up", "Terrified", and in particular "Pale Blue Dot (Interlude)") is the concept that human existence is insignificant in comparison to the universe as a whole, and that wars, fighting and killing seem pointless.

Opener "Choose Your Fate" is an anti-George W. Bush track that is reminiscent of Atreyu with its breakdowns and melodic-screamo bridge section. It was similar in style to the band's "Divide and Conquer" (from Page Avenue) and "March of the Dead" (from Determination). "Angel in the Swamp" takes influence from the Movielife, touching on pop punk, and concluding with Queens of the Stone Age-esque guitar work. Marsala wrote it in response to a message he received on Myspace. The sender relayed that she had been in an abusive household and was having problems; she mentioned that the only thing that was helping her was the group's music.

"We're Not Gonna Make It" talks about a couple in a biracial-relationship; its chorus recalled the Page Avenue single "Anthem of Our Dying Day". The piano ballad "Terrified" is a lo-fi track the channels Funeral for a Friend, specifically their song "History". The track "Pale Blue Dot (Interlude)" was inspired by the famous photograph of the same name and features an excerpt from astronomer Carl Sagan's book Pale Blue Dot: A Vision of the Human Future in Space read by its author. "Welcome to Our New War" was compared to Bullet for My Valentine.

Release
On January 26, 2008, The Black Swan was announced for release in April, and "Wake Up" was made available for streaming. The album's artwork and track listing were revealed two days later. "Wake Up" was released to radio on February 19. On April 2, the music video for it premiered on MTV; it sees the band performing in an abandoned warehouse while people use spray-paint around them. In early April, the band appeared at the Bamboozle Left festival. The Black Swan was made available for streaming on April 15, 2008, before being released on April 22. Between June and August, the band performed on the 2008 Warped Tour. "Message to the World" was released to radio on July 1. The group toured as part of the 2008 Taste of Chaos European tour in October. The band performed at the Musink Festival in February 2009. A music video was released for "Terrified" on July 1, 2009; it trails a soldier in Iraq as his wife and daughter await his return home. Clips of the soldier are intermixed with video diary-style footage of his family.

Reception

Critical reception for The album was generally positive, and the album did fairly well commercially. It debuted on the UK rock charts at number 6  and at number 18 on the US Billboard 200 chart, selling about 21,000 copies in its first week.

Track listing
All songs written by Story of the Year.

Personnel
Personnel per booklet.

Story of the Year
 Dan Marsala – lead vocals
 Ryan Phillips – guitar
 Philip Sneed – guitar, backing vocals
 Adam Russell – bass guitar
 Josh Wills – drums

Additional musicians
 John Feldmann – additional string arrangements, percussion, keys, vocals
 Matt Appleton – additional keys, vocals
 Julian Feldmann – additional vocals (track 11)

Production
 Michael Baskette – producer (all except tracks 2, 4, 7 and 11), mixing (all except track 2)
 Dave Holdredge – mixing (all except track 2), engineer (all except tracks 2, 4, 7 and 11)
 Jef Moll – digital editing
 John Feldmann – producer (tracks 2, 4, 7 and 11), recording (tracks 2, 4, 7 and 11)
 Matt Appleton – engineer (tracks 2, 4, 7 and 11)
 Kyle Moorman – engineer (tracks 2, 4, 7 and 11)
 Chris Lord-Alge – mixing (track 2)
 Ted Jensen – mastering
 Studio One – swan logo
 Bryan Sheffield – band photography

Release history

Charts

References

External links

 The Black Swan at YouTube (streamed copy where licensed)

2008 albums
Epitaph Records albums
Story of the Year albums
Albums produced by John Feldmann
Albums produced by Michael Baskette